Policy is a deliberate system of guidelines to guide decisions and achieve rational outcomes. A policy is a statement of intent and is implemented as a procedure or protocol. Policies are generally adopted by a governance body within an organization. Policies can assist in both subjective and objective decision making. Policies used in subjective decision-making usually assist senior management with decisions that must be based on the relative merits of a number of factors, and as a result, are often hard to test objectively, e.g. work–life balance policy... Moreover, Governments and other institutions have policies in the form of laws, regulations, procedures, administrative actions, incentives and voluntary practices. Frequently, resource allocations mirror policy decisions.

Policy is a blueprint of the organizational activities which are repetitive/routine in nature.

In contrast, policies to assist in objective decision-making are usually operational in nature and can be objectively tested, e.g. password policy.

The term may apply to government, public sector organizations and groups, as well as individuals, Presidential executive orders, corporate privacy policies, and parliamentary rules of order are all examples of policy. Policy differs from rules or law. While the law can compel or prohibit behaviors (e.g. a law requiring the payment of taxes on income), policy merely guides actions toward those that are most likely to achieve the desired outcome.

Policy or policy study may also refer to the process of making important organizational decisions, including the identification of different alternatives such as programs or spending priorities, and choosing among them on the basis of the impact they will have. Policies can be understood as political, managerial, financial, and administrative mechanisms arranged to reach explicit goals. In public corporate finance, a critical accounting policy is a policy for a firm/company or an industry that is considered to have a notably high subjective element, and that has a material impact on the financial statements.

Effects

Intended effects and policy-design
The intended effects of a policy vary widely according to the organization and the context in which they are made. Broadly, policies are typically instituted to avoid some negative effect that has been noticed in the 
organization, or to seek some positive benefit.

A meta-analysis of policy studies concluded that international treaties that aim to foster global cooperation have mostly failed to produce their intended effects in addressing global challenges, and sometimes may have led to unintended harmful or net negative effects. The study suggests enforcement mechanisms are the "only modifiable treaty design choice" with the potential to improve the effectiveness.

Corporate purchasing policies provide an example of how organizations attempt to avoid negative  effects. Many large companies have policies that all purchases above a certain value must be performed through a purchasing process. By requiring this standard purchasing process through policy, the organization can limit waste and standardize the way purchasing is done. 

The State of California provides an example of benefit-seeking policy. In recent years, the numbers of hybrid cars in California has increased dramatically, in part because of policy changes in Federal law that provided USD $1,500 in tax credits (since phased out) as well as the use of high-occupancy vehicle lanes to hybrid owners (no loew hybrid vehicles). In this case, the organization (state and/or federal government) created an effect (increased ownership and use of hybrid vehicles) through policy (tax breaks, highway lanes).

Unintended
Policies frequently have side effects or unintended consequences.  Because the environments that policies seek to influence or manipulate are typically complex adaptive systems (e.g. governments, societies, large companies), making a policy change can have counterintuitive results.  For example, a government may make a policy decision to raise taxes, in hopes of increasing overall tax revenue.  Depending on the size of the tax increase, this may have the overall effect of reducing tax revenue by causing capital flight or by creating a rate so high that citizens are deterred from earning the money that is taxed. (See the Laffer curve.) 

The policy formulation process theoretically includes an attempt to assess as many areas of potential policy impact as possible, to lessen the chances that a given policy will have unexpected or unintended consequences.

Cycle

In political science, the policy cycle is a tool used for analyzing the development of a policy. It can also be referred to as a "stages model" or "stages heuristic". It is thus a rule of thumb rather than the actual reality of how policy is created, but has been influential in how political scientists looked at policy in general. It was developed as a theory from Harold Lasswell's work. It is called the policy cycle as the final stage (evaluation) often leads back to the first stage (problem definition), thus restarting the cycle.

Harold Lasswell's popular model of the policy cycle divided the process into seven distinct stages, asking questions of both how and why public policies should be made. With the stages ranging from (1) intelligence, (2) promotion, (3) prescription, (4) invocation, (5) application, (6) termination and (7) appraisal, this process inherently attempts to combine policy implementation to formulated policy goals.

One version by James E. Anderson, in his Public Policy-Making (1974) has the following stages:
 Agenda setting (Problem identification) – The recognition of certain subject as a problem demanding further government attention. 
 Policy formulation – Involves exploring a variation of options or alternative courses of action available for addressing the problem. (appraisal, dialogue, formulation, and consolidation)
 Decision-making – Government decides on an ultimate course of action, whether to perpetuate the policy status quo or alter it. (Decision could be 'positive', 'negative', or 'no-action') 
 Implementation – The ultimate decision made earlier will be put into practice.
 Evaluation – Assesses the effectiveness of a public policy in terms of its perceived intentions and results. Policy actors attempt to determine whether the course of action is a success or failure by examining its impact and outcomes.
Anderson's version of the stages model is the most common and widely recognised out of the models. However, it could also be seen as flawed. According to Paul A. Sabatier, the model has "outlived its usefulness" and should be replaced. The model's issues have led to a paradoxical situation in which current research and updated versions of the model continue to rely on the framework created by Anderson. But the very concept of the stages model has been discredited, which attacks the cycle's status as a heuristic.

Due to these problems, alternative and newer versions of the model have aimed to create a more comprehensive view of the policy cycle. An eight step policy cycle is developed in detail in The Australian Policy Handbook by Peter Bridgman and Glyn Davis: (now with Catherine Althaus in its 4th and 5th editions)

 Issue identification
 Policy analysis
 Consultation (which permeates the entire process)
 Policy instrument development
 Building coordination and coalitions
 Program Design: Decision making
 Policy Implementation
 Policy Evaluation

The Althaus, Bridgman & Davis model is heuristic and iterative. Policy cycles are typically characterized as adopting a classical approach, and tend to describe processes from the perspective of policy decision makers. Accordingly, some postpositivist academics challenge cyclical models as unresponsive and unrealistic, preferring systemic and more complex models. They consider a broader range of actors involved in the policy space that includes civil society organisations, the media, intellectuals, think tanks or policy research institutes, corporations, lobbyists, etc.

Content
Policies are typically promulgated through official written documents. Policy documents often come with the endorsement or signature of the executive powers within an organization to legitimize the policy and demonstrate that it is considered in force. Such documents often have standard formats that are particular to the organization issuing the policy.  While such formats differ in form, policy documents usually contain certain standard components including:
 A purpose statement, outlining why the organization is issuing the policy, and what its desired effect or outcome of the policy should be.
 An applicability and scope statement, describing who the policy affects and which actions are impacted by the policy. The applicability and scope may expressly exclude certain people, organizations, or actions from the policy requirements.  Applicability and scope is used to focus the policy on only the desired targets, and avoid unintended consequences where possible.
 An effective date which indicates when the policy comes into force.  Retroactive policies are rare, but can be found.
 A responsibilities section, indicating which parties and organizations are responsible for carrying out individual policy statements.  Many policies may require the establishment of some ongoing function or action.  For example, a purchasing policy might specify that a purchasing office be created to process purchase requests, and that this office would be responsible for ongoing actions.  Responsibilities often include identification of any relevant oversight and/or governance structures.
 Policy statements indicating the specific regulations, requirements, or modifications to organizational behavior that the policy is creating.  Policy statements are extremely diverse depending on the organization and intent, and may take almost any form.

Some policies may contain additional sections, including:
 Background, indicating any reasons, history, ethical background statements, and/or intent that led to the creation of the policy, which may be listed as motivating factors.  This information is often quite valuable when policies must be evaluated or used in ambiguous situations, just as the intent of a law can be useful to a court when deciding a case that involves that law.
 Definitions, providing clear and unambiguous definitions for terms and concepts found in the policy document.

Types
The American political scientist Theodore J. Lowi proposed four types of policy, namely distributive, redistributive, regulatory and constituent in his article "Four Systems of Policy, Politics and Choice" and in "American Business, Public Policy, Case Studies and Political Theory". Policy addresses the intent of the organization, whether government, business, professional, or voluntary. Policy is intended to affect the "real" world, by guiding the decisions that are made. Whether they are formally written or not, most organizations have identified policies.

Policies may be classified in many different ways. The following is a sample of several different types of policies broken down by their effect on members of the organization.

Distributive
Distributive policies extend goods and services to members of an organization, as well as distributing the costs of the goods/services amongst the members of the organization. Examples include government policies that impact spending for welfare, public education, highways, and public safety, or a professional organization's benefits plan.

Regulatory
Regulatory policies, or mandates, limit the discretion of individuals and agencies, or otherwise compel certain types of behavior. These policies are generally thought to be best applied when good behavior can be easily defined and bad behavior can be easily regulated and punished through fines or sanctions. An example of a fairly successful public regulatory policy is that of a highway speed limit.

Constituent
Constituent policies create executive power entities, or deal with laws. Constituent policies also deal with fiscal policy in some circumstances.

Redistributive
Policies are dynamic; they are not just static lists of goals or laws. Policy blueprints have to be implemented, often with unexpected results. Social policies are what happens 'on the ground' when they are implemented, as well as what happens at the decision making or legislative stage.

When the term policy is used, it may also refer to:

 Official government policy (legislation or guidelines that govern how laws should be put into operation)
 Broad ideas and goals in political manifestos and pamphlets
 A company or organization's policy on a particular topic.  For example, the equal opportunity policy of a company shows that the company aims to treat all its staff equally.

The actions the organization actually takes may often vary significantly from stated policy. This difference is sometimes caused by political compromise over policy, while in other situations it is caused by lack of policy implementation and enforcement. Implementing policy may have unexpected results, stemming from a policy whose reach extends further than the problem it was originally crafted to address. Additionally, unpredictable results may arise from selective or idiosyncratic enforcement of policy.

Types of policy analysis include: 

 Causal (resp. non-causal)
 Deterministic (resp. stochastic, randomized and sometimes non-deterministic)
 Index
 Memoryless (e.g., non-stationary)
 Opportunistic (resp. non-opportunistic)
 Stationary (resp. non-stationary)
These qualifiers can be combined, so one could, for example, have a stationary-memoryless-index policy.

Notable schools 

Balsillie School of International Affairs
Blavatnik School of Government 
Goldman School of Public Policy at the University of California Berkeley
 London School of Economics
 King's College London
 The University of Chicago Harris School of Public Policy
 Harvard Kennedy School of Government
 Hertie School of Governance
Munk School of Global Affairs and Public Policy 
Norman Paterson School of International Affairs 
Paul H. Nitze School of Advanced International Studies
 Princeton School of Public and International Affairs
Sciences Po Paris
 University of Cambridge
University of Glasgow
University of Warwick
Paris Nanterre University

Subtypes

Induction of policies 
In contemporary systems of market-oriented economics and of homogeneous voting of delegates and decisions, policy mixes are usually introduced depending on factors that include popularity in the public (influenced via media and education as well as by cultural identity), contemporary economics (such as what is beneficial or a burden in the long- and near-term within it) and a general state of international competition (often the focus of geopolitics). Broadly, considerations include political competition with other parties and social stability as well as national interests within the framework of global dynamics.

Policies or policy-elements can be designed and proposed by a multitude of actors or collaborating actor-networks in various ways. Alternative options as well as organisations and decision-makers that would be responsible for enacting these policies – or explaining their rejection – can be identified. "Policy sequencing" is a concept that integrates mixes of existing or hypothetical policies and arranges them in a sequential order. The use of such frameworks may make complex polycentric governance for the achievement of goals such as climate change mitigation and stoppage of deforestation more easily achievable or more effective, fair, efficient, legitimate and rapidly implemented.

Contemporary ways of policy-making or decision-making may depend on exogenously-driven shocks that "undermine institutionally entrenched policy equilibria" and may not always be functional in terms of sufficiently preventing and solving problems, especially when unpopular policies, regulation of influential entities with vested interests, international coordination and non-reactive strategic long-term thinking and management are needed. In that sense, "reactive sequencing" refers to "the notion that early events in a sequence set in motion a chain of causally linked reactions and counter-reactions which trigger subsequent development". This is a concept separate to policy sequencing in that the latter may require actions from a multitude of parties at different stages for progress of the sequence, rather than an initial "shock", force-exertion or catalysis of chains of events.

In the modern highly interconnected world, polycentric governance has become ever more important – such "requires a complex combination of multiple levels and diverse types of organizations drawn from the public, private, and voluntary sectors that have overlapping realms of responsibility and functional capacities". Key components of policies include command-and-control measures, enabling measures, monitoring, incentives and disincentives.

Science-based policy, related to the more narrow concept of evidence-based policy, may have also become more important. A review about worldwide pollution as a major cause of death – where it found little progress, suggests that successful control of conjoined threats such as pollution, climate change, and biodiversity loss requires a global, "formal science–policy interface", e.g. to "inform intervention, influence research, and guide funding". Broadly, science–policy interfaces include both science in policy and science for policy.

Other uses of the term
 In enterprise architecture for systems design, policy appliances are technical control and logging mechanisms to enforce or reconcile policy (systems use) rules and to ensure accountability in information systems.
 In insurance, policies are contracts between insurer and insured used to indemnify (protect) against potential loss from specified perils. While these documents are referred to as policies, they are in actuality a form of contract – see insurance contract.
 In gambling, policy is a form of an unsanctioned lottery, where players purport to purchase insurance against a chosen number being picked by a legitimate lottery. Or can refer to an ordinary numbers game
 In artificial intelligence planning  and reinforcement learning, a policy prescribes a non-empty deliberation (sequence of actions) given a non-empty sequence of states.
 In debate, the term "policy" is slang for policy or cross-examination debate.

See also

Notes

References

Further reading

External links

 
Politics by issue
Decision-making